Friedenskirche (Peace Church) is a Lutheran church in Stuttgart, Baden-Württemberg, Germany, and the parish church of the Evangelische Friedensgemeinde Stuttgart. The first church, in neo-Romanesque style was consecrated in 1892. Destroyed during World War II, with the exception of the tower, it was rebuilt in the 1960s in concrete, and consecrated anew in 1966. The church also serves as a concert venue.

History

First Friedenskirche 
The first Friedenskirche was built for the Lutheran parish in the centre of Stuttgart from 1890 in neo-Romanesque style, with a double choir and narrow gallery and ceiling supported on wooden columns, to designs by architect , and consecrated on 11 December 1892. The tower, in the middle of the nave, was decorated with sculptures of apostles and Christ blessing.

The church, except for the tower and enclosing walls, burnt out and collapsed after bombing on 19 October 1944, during World War II.

New Friedenskirche 
The church was initially left in ruins, with only the tower still intact; for the holding of services, the large hall in the parish centre was remodelled. In 1959, the parish council decided to commission a new church building. The 1960 competition was won by architect Eberhard Hübner. After the dynamiting in 1962 of the remaining sandstone walls of the former building, construction began in 1964. Although the architect favoured the use of natural stone, the parish decided on concrete, making it the first church in Stuttgart to be built using this material. The new church was built with a flat roof, and the tower topped with a metal helmet. Consecrated in 1966 with enough space for 700 worshippers, the church also serves a Korean parish and a Nambu parish.

In 2020, Volker Lutz wrote a book about the organ. A gospel choir holds monthly concerts.

See also
Kaiser Wilhelm Memorial Church

References

External links 

Sprengung Friedenskirche Stuttgart (video, in German) SWR

19th-century Lutheran churches in Germany
20th-century Lutheran churches in Germany
Churches in Stuttgart
Churches of the Evangelical-Lutheran Church in Württemberg